Sprague is an unincorporated community and coal town in Raleigh County, West Virginia, United States. Sprague has a post office with ZIP code 25926.

The community was named in 1902.

Climate
The climate in this area has mild differences between highs and lows, and there is adequate rainfall year-round.  According to the Köppen Climate Classification system, Sprague has a marine west coast climate, abbreviated "Cfb" on climate maps.

References

Unincorporated communities in Raleigh County, West Virginia
Unincorporated communities in West Virginia
Coal towns in West Virginia